Ruth Platt is a British actress, writer and director, who has appeared in The Pianist (2002).

Early life
Platt studied English literature at University College, Oxford, before training at RADA.

Career
In 2015, Platt directed a British horror film, The Lesson which was inspired by Platt's own experience and an article she read where a teacher had a history of violence. In 2019, she directed The Black Forest which screened at Edinburgh International Film Festival.

Films
 The Prince and the Pauper (2000) as Sarah
The Pianist (2002) as Janina Bogucki
The Lesson (2015) as director 
The Black Forest (2019) as director
Martyrs Lane (2021) as director

Television
Bad Girls (series 5) (2003)
Heartbeat

References

External links
 

British actresses
Living people
Alumni of University College, Oxford
Year of birth missing (living people)